A list of films produced in Italy in 1954 (see 1954 in film):

A-B

C-F

G-I

J-M

N-P

Q-S

T-Z

References

External links
Italian films of 1954 at the Internet Movie Database

Italian
1954
Films